May the Lord Be with Us (originally titled Defenestrace) is a 2018 Czech historical television film directed by Zdeněk Jiráský. It was coproduced by Czech Television, Arte and ORF. It premiered at Finále Plzeň Film Festival. The film was watched by 799,000 people.

Plot
The film is set during the Bohemian Revolt that triggered the Thirty Years' War. The main characters are Jindřich Matyáš Thurn, Ferdinand II and Frederick I, known as the Winter King.

Cast
Karel Dobrý as Jindřich Matyáš Thurn
Ondřej Malý as Ferdinand II, Holy Roman Emperor
Eva Josefíková as Eleonora Gonzaga
Štěpán Kozub as Frederick I of Bohemia
Sára Sandeva as Elizabeth Stuart, Queen of Bohemia
Tereza Hofová as Zuzana Alžběta Thurn
Robert Mikluš as Kryštof Harant
Jiří Maryško as Abraham Scultetus
Adrian Jastraban as Vilém Slavata of Chlum
Pavel Tesař as Jaroslav Bořita of Martinice
Marek Pospíchal as Filip Fabricius
Jiří Černý as Wilhelm Lamormaini
Zdeněk Černín as Václav Budovec
Ondřej Bauer as Jáchym Ondřej Šlik
Dan Dittrich as Václav Vilém of Roupov
Michal Dalecký as Young Officer
Daniela Šišková as Lady's Maid

Reception
Martin Staněk praised the film's focus on historical events. He also stated that the film was well-written and well-directed.

References

External links
 
 Official website

2018 television films
Austrian historical drama films
2010s Czech-language films
Czech historical drama films
German historical drama films
Films set in the 1610s
Czech television films
Czech Television original films
2010s historical drama films
2018 films
2010s German films